is a Japanese voice actor and singer previously affiliated with Space Craft Entertainment. He became a freelancer in September 2018. He joined the record label, Toy's Factory, in December 2018. He made his solo singer debut under Lantis in July 2018 with the song "miserable masquerade" produced by Satoru Kuwabara. He played Saitama in One-Punch Man, Banri Tada in Golden Time,  Miyuki Shirogane in Kaguya-sama: Love Is War and Shaddiq Zenelli in Mobile Suit Gundam: The Witch from Mercury. He also played two different versions of Sherlock Holmes in Moriarty the Patriot and The Tale of the Outcasts.

Voice roles

Anime television series
2012
Hidamari Sketch × Honeycomb, Yoshio

2013
A Certain Scientific Railgun S, Kenji Madarame
Gaist Crusher, Shiren Quartzheart
Golden Time, Banri Tada
Log Horizon, Smoking Thunder
Sunday Without God, Menhim

2014
Aldnoah.Zero, Shigō Kakei
Haikyū!!, Yūtarō Kindaichi
Bladedance of Elementalers, Kamito Kazehaya

2015
Aldnoah.Zero Part 2, Shigō Kakei
Haikyū!! 2, Yūtarō Kindaichi
Is It Wrong to Try to Pick Up Girls in a Dungeon?, Miach
High School DxD BorN, Diodora Astaroth
Mikagura School Suite, Sadamatsu Minatogawa
One-Punch Man, Saitama
The Heroic Legend of Arslan, Kirus
Anti-Magic Academy: The 35th Test Platoon, Reima Tenmyōji

2016
Please Tell Me! Galko-chan, Bomuo
PriPara, Ham
Orange, Hiroto Suwa
Taboo Tattoo, Justice "Seigi" Akatsuka
The Disastrous Life of Saiki K., Male Ghost
91 Days, Arturo Tronco
Digimon Universe: Appli Monsters, Yūjin Ōzora
Touken Ranbu: Hanamaru, Ookurikara
Duel Masters VSRF, Number 2

2017
ACCA: 13-Territory Inspection Dept., Biscuit
One Piece, Zappa
Beyblade Burst God, Joshua Boon
Akashic Records of Bastard Magic Instructor, Rainer
Katsugeki/Touken Ranbu, Ookurikara
Fate/Apocrypha, Rider of Red/Achilles
Altair: A Record of Battles, Zaganos Zehir
TSUKIPRO THE ANIMATION, Soshi Kagurazaka

2018
Touken Ranbu: Hanamaru 2, Ookurikara
My Hero Academia 3, Seiji Shishikura
Hakyu Hoshin Engi, Nataku
Banana Fish, Shorter Wong
That Time I Got Reincarnated as a Slime, Benimaru
Strike the Blood, Veres Aladar

2019
Kaguya-sama: Love Is War, Miyuki Shirogane
Fruits Basket, Hatsuharu Sōma
Kono Oto Tomare! Sounds of Life, Michitaka Sakai
One-Punch Man 2, Saitama
Dr. Stone, Taiju Ōki
Vinland Saga, The Ear
Ahiru no Sora, Shingo Katori
Stars Align, Takuto Murakami
Demon Slayer: Kimetsu no Yaiba, Gotou
The King of Fighters for Girls, Yomi

2020
number24, Taisei Uchinashi
Drifting Dragons, Faye
Kaguya-sama: Love Is War?, Miyuki Shirogane
Natsunagu!, Masayoshi Maezono
Woodpecker Detective's Office, Bokusui Wakayama
Fire Force, Ogun Montgomery
No Guns Life, Colt
Mr Love: Queen's Choice, Shaw
Moriarty the Patriot, Sherlock Holmes
The Misfit of Demon King Academy, Laos Kanon Jilfor
By the Grace of the Gods, Tabuchi
Yu-Gi-Oh! Sevens, Nanami Maguro

2021
Show by Rock!! Stars!!, Rikao
Skate-Leading Stars, Hayato Sasugai
That Time I Got Reincarnated as a Slime Season 2, Benimaru
Dr. Stone: Stone Wars, Taiju Ōki
Burning Kabaddi, Kei Iura
Kuro-Gyaru ni Natta Kara Shinyū to Shite Mita, Rui Chihaya
Mars Red, Rufus Glenn
The Slime Diaries: That Time I Got Reincarnated as a Slime, Benimaru
Odd Taxi,  Yamamoto
86, Shourei Nouzen
Re-Main, Takekazu Ejiri
TSUKIPRO THE ANIMATION2, Soshi Kagurazaka
The Vampire Dies in No Time, Ronaldo
Visual Prison, Guiltia Brion

2022
Fantasia Sango - Realm of Legends, Teiken
Salaryman's Club, Naohiro Izumo
Love All Play, Kōki Matsuda
Aoashi, Eita Takasugi
Kaguya-sama: Love Is War – Ultra Romantic, Miyuki Shirogane
Fuuto PI, Ryū Terui
Mobile Suit Gundam: The Witch from Mercury, Shaddiq Zenelli
Play It Cool, Guys, Motoharu Igarashi

2023
The Tale of the Outcasts, Holmes
In/Spectre 2nd Season, Masayuki Muroi
Technoroid Overmind, Kite
The Angel Next Door Spoils Me Rotten, Shuuto Fujimiya
Hell's Paradise: Jigokuraku, Yamada Asaemon Eizen
Opus Colors, Chiharu Sakaki
Mahō Shōjo Magical Destroyers, Otaku Hero
Ao no Orchestra, Ichirō Yamada

Original net animation
A.I.C.O. -Incarnation- (2018), Yoshihiko Sagami
JoJo's Bizarre Adventure: Stone Ocean (2022), Rikiel

Film
The Anthem of the Heart (2015), Toshinori Iwaki
Orange: Future (2016), Hiroto Suwa
Fairy Tail: Dragon Cry (2017), King Animus
Mobile Suit Gundam Narrative (2018)
Blue Thermal (2022), Ryōhei Nanba
That Time I Got Reincarnated as a Slime the Movie: Scarlet Bond (2022), Benimaru
Kaguya-sama: Love Is War – The First Kiss That Never Ends (2022), Miyuki Shirogane

Tokusatsu
Kamen Rider Ghost (2015), Second Katana Gamma (ep. 13 (First Voiced by Takahiro Fujiwara (ep. 1))
Shuriken Sentai Ninninger vs. ToQger the Movie: Ninja in Wonderland (2016), Dark Akaninger

Video games
THE iDOLM@STER: SideM (2015), Asselin BB II
Shin Sangoku Musou Eiketsuden (2016), Lei Bin
Touken Ranbu (2015), Ookurikara
Idolish7 (2016), Okazaki Rinto
Yumeiro Cast (2015), Kuroki Ryousuke
 Psychedelica of the Ashen Hawk (2016), Lugus
TSUKINO PARADISE (2017), Soshi Kagurazaka
Akane-sasu Sekai de Kimi to Utau (2017), Mononobe no Moriya
Fate/Grand Order (2018), Achilles
Mega Man 11 (2018), Fuse Man
Steam Prison (2018), Adage
Warriors Orochi 4 (2018), Ares
SHOW BY ROCK!! (2018), Rikao
Ikemen Revolution (2016), Kyle Ash
Bungo to Alchemist(2019), Tokutomi Roka 
Samurai Shodown (2019), Yoshitora Tokugawa
Fire Emblem: Three Houses (2019), Sylvain Jose Gautier
Hero's Park (2019), Nachi Touya
Mr Love: Queen's Choice (2020), Shū (Shaw)
Tsukihime -A piece of blue glass moon- (2021), Arihiko Inui
Alchemy Stars (2021), Charon
Honkai: Star Rail (2021), Gepard
River City Girls 2 (2022), Kunio
Triangle Strategy (2022), Exharme Marcial

Commercials
Toyota Raize (2020), Raize

Drama CD
 Golden Sparkle (2019), Gaku Asada
 Given (2016), Natsuki Kizu
 Given 2 (2017), Natsuki Kizu
 Given 3 (2018), Natsuki Kizu
 Given 4 (2018), Natsuki Kizu
 Given 5 (2019), Natsuki Kizu

Discography (as a singer)

Singles

Albums

References

External links
Official agency profile
Lantis profile
 Makoto Furukawa's blog  at Ameblo 
 
 
 

Japanese male pop singers
Japanese male video game actors
Japanese male voice actors
Living people
Male voice actors from Kumamoto Prefecture
Musicians from Kumamoto Prefecture
1989 births
21st-century Japanese male actors
21st-century Japanese singers
21st-century Japanese male singers